Downtown Burbank station is a passenger rail station near downtown Burbank, California. It is served by Metrolink's Antelope Valley Line to Lancaster and Ventura County Line to East Ventura with both terminating at Los Angeles Union Station. A limited number of  Amtrak trains stop at this station; with all Amtrak trains stopping at the Burbank Airport–South station, several miles to the northwest of downtown Burbank. Megabus started providing long distance motorcoach service from the station on August 15, 2013, but it has since been discontinued.

References

External links 

Burbank.com: Metrolink

Metrolink stations in Los Angeles County, California
Buildings and structures in Burbank, California
Public transportation in the San Fernando Valley
Railway stations in the United States opened in 1992
1992 establishments in California